Huddersfield Town's 1994–95 campaign was Town's first season in their new stadium, the Alfred McAlpine Stadium. After playing at Leeds Road for 86 years, Town moved to the new stadium with a then capacity of around 20,000. Under the leadership of Neil Warnock, Town finished in 5th place, but after qualifying for the play-offs, Town beat 2nd placed Brentford, they beat 4th placed Bristol Rovers at Wembley Stadium.

Squad at the start of the season

Review
Following a mediocre season the previous year, many were hoping the move to the Alfred McAlpine Stadium, many were hoping a charge up the Division 2 ladder.

In the summer of 1994, popular full-back Tom Cowan made his loan move from Sheffield United a permanent one, centre-back Kevin Gray arrived from Mansfield Town in a part exchange with Iffy Onuora, and midfielder Paul Reid made the switch from local rivals Bradford City. Phil Starbuck, despite speculation about a move to Notts County, signed a new deal that stipulated he was made new club captain. In addition to these signings, veteran striker Ronnie Jepson was revitalised and formed a potent strikeforce with the precocious Booth. A first-day 4–1 drubbing of Blackpool at Bloomfield Road, Reid and Jepson scoring twice, signalled that Town meant business.

A brilliant start to the season saw Town beat Blackpool 4–1 at Bloomfield Road, a 1–0 defeat to Wycombe Wanderers in their home league game followed, but they then went on a run of 13 league games without defeat, which was brought to an abrupt halt by a 3–0 defeat at York City. During Town's 2nd round match in the Auto Windscreens Shield, Iain Dunn became the first person in England to score a golden goal in first-class professional football.

In August 1994, the Terriers opened their new home with a 0–1 defeat to Martin O'Neill's recently promoted Wycombe Wanderers. However, things were soon to get much better for Warnock's team, Jepson and Booth amassing 53 goals between them in League and cup. Town soon reached the top of the league, where they would battle with Birmingham City and Brentford for the one automatic spot that season. But with Starbuck unable to find his form, the festive period saw a downturn in their fortunes. Starbuck had played his last game for the club and would move on loan to Sheffield United, later making his move permanent. Despite a substantial outlay on the Bradford City Lees (Sinnott and Duxbury) with Graham Mitchell going in the other direction, the first warning signs came with some poor results over the festive season, including defeats at Wycombe and Hull City. The Terriers challenge started to fade around Easter with solitary points gained in Yorkshire derbies against Hull City and Rotherham United and a defeat in a match played in farcical conditions at Shrewsbury Town signalled the end of Town's automatic hopes. Warnock's men limped over the finish line in 5th place (one of their lowest positions in months) and signed off with a home defeat by newly crowned champions Birmingham.

A two-legged play-off against 2nd placed Brentford then followed. After a 1–1 draw at the McAlpine, many thought Town blew it again, but a 1–1 draw at Griffin Park led to a penalty shoot-out. After Pat Scully missed, Steve Francis saved the penalties of both Denny Mundee and Jamie Bates, it was left to Darren Bullock to score the winner to send Town to Wembley for a match against 4th placed Bristol Rovers.

At Wembley, Town took the lead in the play-off final with a goal from Andy Booth one minute from half-time, but within a minute of the goal, future Town player Marcus Stewart levelled proceedings, but with less than 10 minutes remaining Huddersfield-born Chris Billy scored the winning goal which gained Town's promotion. Within a few days of winning promotion, Neil Warnock left to become manager of Plymouth Argyle.

Squad at the end of the season

Results

Second Division

Promotion play-offs

Play-off final

FA Cup

League Cup

League Trophy

Appearances and goals

Huddersfield Town A.F.C. seasons
Huddersfield Town F.C.